Syahrul Sazali  is a Singaporean professional footballer who plays as a defender for Singapore Premier League club Tampines Rovers.

International 

Syahrul was named as one of the three overaged player for the 17th Sea Games in Hanoi.  

He scored his 1st international goal in an U23 match against Fiji on 6 September 2019.

Career statistics 

As of 10 Oct 2021

Honours

International
Singapore U22
 Merlion Cup: 2019

Others

Singapore Selection Squad
He was selected as part of the Singapore Selection squad for The Sultan of Selangor's Cup to be held on 24 August 2019.

References

External links 

Living people
Singaporean footballers
Association football midfielders
Singapore Premier League players
1998 births
Competitors at the 2019 Southeast Asian Games
Young Lions FC players
Competitors at the 2021 Southeast Asian Games
Southeast Asian Games competitors for Singapore